Laurent Garcia (born 31 May 1970) is a French politician representing the Democratic Movement. He was elected to the French National Assembly on 18 June 2017, representing the department of Meurthe-et-Moselle.

Garcia was elected in 1990 as the head of the International League against Racism and Anti-Semitism in Meurthe-et-Moselle. He was also elected the mayor of Laxou in 2008 where he would remain until his election to the Assembly in 2017.

References

1970 births
Living people
Deputies of the 15th National Assembly of the French Fifth Republic
Democratic Movement (France) politicians
French people of Spanish descent
Mayors of places in Grand Est
Politicians from Paris
Members of Parliament for Meurthe-et-Moselle